The 5th Special Air Service (5th SAS) was an elite airborne unit during World War II. It consisted entirely of Belgian volunteers. It saw action as part of the SAS Brigade in Normandy, Northern France, Belgium, the Netherlands and (Germany). Initially trained in sabotage and intelligence gathering, they converted to motorized reconnaissance on armored jeeps. They were the first Allied unit to set foot onto Belgian soil and the first to cross the Siegfried line, albeit accidentally.

History

A Belgian Independent Parachute Company was officially founded at Malvern Wells (Worcestershire) on 8 May 1942 by Henri Rolin, the then-Belgian undersecretary for defense. It comprised the following:

 A Company, 2nd Battalion Belgian Fusiliers, a Battalion mainly made up of Belgian volunteers from South and North America organised after January 1941, who moved to Great Britain in June 1941. A Company as a whole volunteered in February 1942 to train as an Independent Parachute Company under Lt. Freddy Limbosch as Chief Instructor.
 A platoon of the 1st Battalion Belgian Fusiliers with some qualified parachutists (since January 1942).
 Volunteers from other Belgian Forces units who had escaped occupied Belgium via France, Spain and Gibraltar.

The newly formed Company continued to train as an Independent Parachute Company, making extensive use of the schools and training facilities offered by the British (the first Parachutists wings worn by Belgians were earned at Ringway parachute school in early 1942).

The unit was attached for 3 months to the 8th Parachute Battalion of the 6th Airborne Division in 1943, then spent a month in intensive training in December 1943 at the Allied Training Centre Inverlochy Castle (Fort William), and finally in February 1944, at Loudon Castle Camp, near Galston (Ayrshire) joining the Special Air Service (S.A.S.) Brigade.

Like all military units and formations the men came from all walks of life. The volunteers included a former world cycling champion, lawyers, farmers, labourers, lumberjacks, a circus acrobat, a professional wrestler and three barons. The commanding officer was a qualified engineer and dentist. The men who volunteered came from across the world to fight Nazis. Not all of them could even speak the same language. Some spoke French, some Dutch and others only English. These differences of upbringing, class, lifestyle and even language might have seemed problematic, but esprit de corps developed within the unit.

The role of the Belgian SAS parachutists during the Second World War was primarily sabotage, intelligence and reconnaissance. The men saw their first action towards the end of July 1944 in France. During the Ardennes offensive the unit was regrouped and equipped with armored jeeps. As a reconnaissance squadron, they executed security and reconnaissance missions in support of the 6th British Airborne Division. They did so during the Battle of Bure. In 1945 they were used for counter-intelligence work that involved the location and arrest of top-ranking Nazis and war criminals.

In the beginning of April 1945 the Belgian SAS Squadron consisted of three reconnaissance squads that deployed in the north of the Netherlands and in Germany. After the capitulation of the Germans on 8 May 1945 the Belgian SAS participated in 'Counter Intelligence' missions in both (Germany) and Denmark.

At the end of the war the Belgian SAS Regiment were the first Allied unit to set foot in Belgium and Germany and the only Belgian unit permanently on active deployment between July 1944 and May 1945. They were responsible for the capture of Admiral Doenitz's government in Flensburg and the German Foreign minister Ribbentrop.

Insignia

The cap badge is a downward pointing flaming sword worked in cloth of a Crusader shield. It was designed by Corporal Robert Tait, MM and Bar, following the usual British Army practice of holding a competition to design the cap badge for a new unit. The competition was held after the close of Operation Crusader. The motto is Who Dares, Wins. It was approved by the first Commanding Officer David Stirling, with the proposed wording 'Descend to Defend' or 'Strike and Destroy' disallowed. The sword depicted is  the Sword of Damocles
The Maroon beret.
The SAS pattern parachute wings were designed by Lieutenant Jock Lewes and based on the basic British Army design approved in 1940, but modified to reflect the Middle East origins of the new unit by the substitution of the stylised sacred ibis wings of Isis of Egyptian iconography depicted in the décor of Shepheard's Hotel in Cairo.

Disbandment

On 21 September 1945 5th SAS was transferred from the British Army to the newly reformed Belgian Army. Renamed the 1st Regiment of Parachutists they served independently as a mobile airborne unit until 1952 when the regiment joined with the Commando Regiment to form a battalion of the Paracommando Regiment. From 1952 on the traditions of 5th SAS were continued by 1st Parachute Battalion (1 PARA) of the Paracommando Regiment.

Amid defense cuts and reorganization to the Belgian army, in 2011 1 PARA was disbanded after 59 years of continuous service. In December 2010 the unit's banner, flag and insignia were officially handed over to the newly formed Special Forces Group (SFG).

The last veteran of 5th Special Air Service was Jaak Daemen from Leopoldsburg who died in August 2022, aged 97.

See also

 Belgium in World War II
 German occupation of Belgium during World War II
 List of SAS operations

References

Bibliography

Army units and formations of Belgium in World War II
Special Air Service
Special forces of Belgium
Military units and formations established in 1942
1942 establishments in England
Military units and formations disestablished in 1945
5th Special Air Service